Saw Pale was duchess of Yamethin  1351 to 1395/96. She was the eldest younger sister of King Swa Saw Ke of Ava, the mother of Queen Min Hla Myat of Ava, and the maternal grandmother of King Kale Kye-Taung Nyo of Ava.

Ancestry
Saw Pale was descended from the Pagan royalty from both sides, and was a grandniece of King Thihathu of Pinya.

Notes

References

Bibliography
 

Pinya dynasty
Ava dynasty